Crane Lake is an unincorporated community in Crane Lake Township, Saint Louis County, Minnesota, United States; located within the Kabetogama State Forest.

The community is located 27 miles northeast of Orr, along Saint Louis County Roads 23 and 24.  Crane Lake is located 45 miles northeast of Cook.  The northern terminus of County Road 24 is at Crane Lake.

Crane Lake is the southern entry to the Voyageurs National Park; the western entry to the Boundary Waters Canoe Area Wilderness; and an entry into Canada.

Notes
Adjacent Crane Lake is known for walleye and small mouth bass fishing; having access to Sand Point Lake, Namakan Lake, Loon Lake, Lac La Croix, Ash River, and Kabetogama Lake, make the area a large chain of lakes.  The Superior National Forest borders the east side of Crane Lake.

References

 Rand McNally Road Atlas – 2007 edition – Minnesota entry
 Official State of Minnesota Highway Map – 2011/2012 edition

Unincorporated communities in Minnesota
Unincorporated communities in St. Louis County, Minnesota